Cosmin Aurel Rațiu (born 18 July 1979 in Petrosani) is a retired Romanian rugby union player. He also played as a lock or flanker. He is currently a coach.

Club career
He played for CS Dinamo București until moving to Stade Montois in France for the 2006–07 season. He currently plays for Politehnica Iași in the SuperLiga.

International career
He gathered 34 caps for Romania, having made his debut in 2003 against the Czech Republic. He has scored 2 tries, 10 points overall. He played at the 2007 Rugby World Cup and played all four games, three of them as a substitute. He also played at the 2011 Rugby World Cup.

References

External links

1979 births
Living people
People from Petroșani
Romanian rugby union players
Romania international rugby union players
Romania national rugby union team coaches
Romanian expatriate rugby union players
Expatriate rugby union players in France
Romanian expatriate sportspeople in France
CS Dinamo București (rugby union) players
Stade Montois players
RCJ Farul Constanța players
CSA Steaua București (rugby union) players
CSM București (rugby union) players
CS Politehnica Iași (rugby union) players
Rugby union locks
Rugby union flankers